Oregon Route 335 is an Oregon state highway running from Helix to OR 11 near Pendleton. OR 335 is known as the Havana-Helix Highway No. 335 (see Oregon highways and routes).

OR 335 was established in 2003 as part of Oregon's project to assign route numbers to highways that previously were not assigned, and, as of October 2020, was unsigned.

Route description 

OR 335 begins at the intersection of Columbia and Main Streets in Helix and heads south  to an intersection with OR 334.

History 

OR 335 was assigned to the Havana-Helix Highway in 2003.

Vansycle Road, the continuation of OR 335 beyond Helix, was proposed in the 1950s as an alternative to U.S. Route 730 and Oregon Route 11.

Major intersections

References 

335
Transportation in Umatilla County, Oregon